Elle Limebear (born 2 April 1997) is a British worship singer, songwriter and artist.

Early life and family
Elle Limebear was born to Martin Smith and Anna Smith in 1997 in Chichester, England. She grew up in Rusington in a religious family. Her grandfather was the pastor of the local church, Arun Community Church.

In 2015, she joined her father's band and lead worship at various churches and tours. She has been married to Tom Limebear since 2017 and lives in Brighton, England. They have a son together, named Maccabee, born in 2021.

Career
In May 2018, she was signed by Provident Label Group, a Christian music label owned by Sony Music. Later that year, she released her first single "Love Song" in collaboration with One Sonic Society which peaked at number 31 on the Billboard Christian Airplay Charts. In January 2019, Limebear was featured in The Own It Tour, a tour by Francesca Battistelli, along with Stars Go Dim. In June 2019, it was announced that Elle will be part of I Am They's tour, The Trial & Triumph. In the same year, she released her first EP, titled Elle Limebear.

In February 2020, Elle released her debut album, Lost In Wonder. In March 2020, she set out on The Roadshow 2020 tour to promote her album, but the tour was cancelled due to the COVID-19 pandemic. In November 2020, she released another EP, Live From Catalyst. The EP consists of three songs, including "Glorious Day", "Maker of The Moon", and "Lord You Have My Heart". In the same year, she was nominated for GMA Dove Award in the New Artist of the Year category.

In 2022, she received a BMI Christian Award for "Alive & Breathing" along with Matt Maher. The song had been number 1 on Billboard's Christian Airplay Chart in 2020 for five weeks.

Elle Limebear is also a member of a music band named Manor Collective.

Discography

Albums
 Lost In Wonder (2020)

EP
 Elle Limebear (2019)
 Live from Catalyst (2020)

Singles
 "Love Song" - with One Sonic Society (2018)
 "Holding Me Still“ (2019)
 "Call On Your Name“ (2019)
 "Maker of the Moon“ (2019)
 "Find Me At Your Feet“ (2019)
 "Fly" (2019)
 "Call On Your Name“ - BCee Remix (2019)
 "Lord You Have My Heart", featuring Martin Smith (2019)
 "What Love Looks Like" (2020)
 "After Your Heart", with SEU Worship (2020) 
 "Angels", featuring Jake Isaac (2020)
 "Seasons", featuring Sarah Bird (2020)
 "Call On Your Name", Piano Version (2021)
 "All The Time" (2021)
 "Rest On Us" (2022)

Awards and recognition
 GMA Dove Award Nominee (2020)
 BMI Christian Award (2022)

References

Living people
1997 births
British gospel singers
People from Chichester